Percy Courtman (14 May 1888 – 2 June 1917) was an English breaststroke swimmer from Chorlton-cum-Hardy, Lancashire who competed for Great Britain in the 1908 Summer Olympics and 1912 Summer Olympics.

He was son of James and his wife, Percy Ann Courtman, who at time of their son's death lived in 261 Stretford Road, Manchester.

In the 1908 Olympics he competed in the 200-metre breaststroke, but was second in his heat and did not advance. Four years later he competed in the 400-metre breaststroke and won a bronze medal. He also competed in the 200 metre breaststroke and was fourth.

He died during World War I in France while serving as a private in the 1st/6th Battalion of the Manchester Regiment, and is buried at Neuville-Bourjonval British Cemetery, Pas-de-Calais.

See also
 List of Olympians killed in World War I
 List of Olympic medalists in swimming (men)
 World record progression 200 metres breaststroke

References

External links
Database Olympics Profile

1888 births
1917 deaths
British military personnel killed in World War I
English male swimmers
Male breaststroke swimmers
Olympic swimmers of Great Britain
Swimmers at the 1908 Summer Olympics
Swimmers at the 1912 Summer Olympics
Olympic bronze medallists for Great Britain
World record setters in swimming
Olympic bronze medalists in swimming
Medalists at the 1912 Summer Olympics
Manchester Regiment soldiers